John Albert "Bertie" de Silva (19 January 1901 – 30 November 1981) was a cricketer who played five matches of first-class cricket for Oxford University in England between 1924 and 1927 and three first-class matches for Dr J Rockwood's Ceylon XI in Ceylon between 1929 and 1930.

De Silva's most successful first-class match was for Oxford University against Harlequins in 1927, when he scored 25 and 65. He returned to Ceylon after graduating, and served in the Forest Department from 1927 to 1957. He was head of the department, with the title Conservator of Forests, from 1950 to 1957.

References

External links

1901 births
1981 deaths
Sri Lankan cricketers
Oxford University cricketers
All-Ceylon cricketers
Alumni of Trinity College, Kandy
Alumni of Keble College, Oxford
Cricketers from Colombo
Sinhalese civil servants
Foresters